Cam ye o'er frae France? is a Scots folk song from the time of the Jacobite rebellions of the 18th century. It satirises the marital problems of the Hanoverian George I.

Background
After the death of Queen Anne the British crown passed on to George, the Elector of Hanover. In his entourage George I brought with him a number of German courtiers, including his mistress Melusine von der Schulenburg, whom he later created the Duchess of Kendal (known as the Goose) and his half-sister Sophia von Kielmansegg (commonly referred to as the Sow). George I's wife Sophia Dorothea of Celle remained in Hanover, imprisoned at Ahlden House after her affair with Philip Christoph von Königsmarck – the blade in the song. Another historic personality in the song is John Erskine, Earl of Mar (Bobbing John) who recruited in the Scottish Highlands for the Jacobite cause. The nickname Geordie Whelps is a reference to the House of Welf, the original line of the House of Hanover.

Tune

Lyrics

(Repeat first verse)

Glossary

a, a' = adj all
 = n bonnet
 = quickly, soon, immediately
 = a person of weak, soft constitution from rapid overgrowth; Count Philip Christoph von Königsmarck of Sweden
 = adj festive; glad; happy; joyful. n gladly, happily.
Bobbing John = John Erskine, Earl of Mar. So called because he switched sides 6 times before his death.
 = broad
 = adj fine; handsome; splendid; admirable; well-dressed; worthy
 = well
ca = v call
 = cloth
cloth = George Augustus 
 = a young cock, or little man with a high opinion of himself. Alexander Gordon, Marquis of Huntly
differ = n difference; dissent. v dissent.
Don = diminutive of Gordon (the last syllable).
 = metaphor for fornication - Count Philip Christoph von Königsmarck of Sweden's alleged affair with Princess Sophia Dorothea of Celle
 = gone
 = by the time, if, whether
 = Jacobite nickname for Melusine von der Schulenburg, Duchess of Kendal, mistress of King George I
ha = n hall; house; mansion.
ha's and mailins = houses and farmlands
 = v have; take; credit (believe/think)
 = a Highland soldier
Highland quorum = either the hunting party on 27 August 1715 or the planning meeting on 3 September 1715
 = buttock
Jocky = a Scotsman. James III
 = n skip; v walk smartly; to make love
 = tripping along
loom = a loom; a metaphor for female sexual organs
loom of Geordie = George I's former wife, Princess Sophia Dorothea of Celle
 = George I
 = a leased smallholding, a farm 
 = broad farmlands 
Montgomery = Sidney, Earl of Godolphin
Montgomery's lady = Queen Mary Beatrice of Modena, wife of James II and mother of James III
 = adj many
 = haggle or exchange; to exchange, to barter with objects hidden in the fists
o'er = over; excessively; too
 = James III
Sandy = diminutive of Alexander. 
Sandy Don = Major-General Alexander Gordon of Auchintoul 
 = success
 = lost; lost (past participle of tine = to lose)
to dance = to raise funds, to raise troops and prepare to fight. Compare the song To Auchindown, which has the lines: "We joined the dance, and kissed the lance, / And swore us foes to strangers."
to dance a jig with Geordie = To fight with George I.
 = web (or length) of cloth); a length of woven cloth from one loom
 = n pledge, security; wager, bet; forfeit. adj wedded. v pledge; wager, bet; wed.
 = pron who

Glossary

Modern recordings 
Ewan MacColl and Peggy Seeger, Songs of Two Rebellions: The Jacobite Wars of 1715 and 1745 in Scotland. Smithsonian Folkways, 1960.
The Corries, Bonnet Belt and Sword, 1967
Steeleye Span, Parcel of Rogues, 1973

References 

Jacobitism
Scottish folk songs
18th-century songs
18th century in Scotland
Scots-language works
Political songs
Jacobite songs
Songs about France
Songs about kings
Year of song unknown
Songwriter unknown
George I of Great Britain
Mary of Modena